William Griffin may refer to:

William Griffin (painter), New Zealand painter
William Griffin (rugby), rugby union and rugby league footballer of the 1950s for Abertillery (RU), Wales (RL), and Huddersfield
William A. Griffin (Christian churches and churches of Christ), Christian preacher and former President of Mid-Atlantic Christian University
William A. Griffin (Roman Catholic bishop) (1885–1950), former Roman Catholic Bishop of Trenton
William D. Griffin (1936–2011), American historian, author, and educator
William Henry Griffin (1812–1990), Canadian civil servant
William Richard Griffin (1882–1944), American Roman Catholic bishop
William Griffin (geologist), recipient of the Clarke Medal for 2013 in the field of geology
Bill Griffin (musician), American mandolinist and luthier
Billy Griffin (footballer) (born 1940), English footballer for Sheffield Wednesday, Bury, Workington and Rotherham United, see List of Sheffield Wednesday F.C. players
Billy Griffin (born 1950), American singer-songwriter
Rakim (William Michael Griffin Jr., born 1968), American rapper
Willie Griffin, Irish hurler

See also
Griffin (surname)